Camponotus barbatus is a species of carpenter ant (genus Camponotus).

Subspecies
Camponotus barbatus barbatus Roger, 1863 - India
Camponotus barbatus infuscoides Bingham, 1903 - Sri Lanka
Camponotus barbatus samarus Santschi, 1932 - Borneo
Camponotus barbatus taylori Forel, 1892 - China, Bangladesh, India

References

External links

 at antwiki.org
Animaldiversity.org
Itis.gov

barbatus
Hymenoptera of Asia
Insects described in 1863
Taxa named by Julius Roger